This is a list of the heritage sites in Tulbagh, Western Cape as recognized by the South African Heritage Resources Agency.

|}

References 

Tulbagh
Heritage sites
Heritage sites